Cue sports for the 2013 Asian Indoor and Martial Arts Games was held at the Songdo Convensia in Incheon, South Korea. It took place from 29 June to 6 July 2013. This was the third time this sport was part of the Games, after Macau 2007 and Hanoi 2009.

Medalists

Men

Women

Medal table

Results

Men

One-cushion singles

Three-cushion singles

English billiards singles

Nine-ball singles

Snooker singles

Snooker team

Six-red snooker singles

Women

Nine-ball singles

Ten-ball singles

Six-red snooker singles

References

 Men's 1 Cushion Single
 Men's 3 Cushion Single
 Men's English Billiard Single
 Men's 9 Ball Single
 Men's Snooker Single
 Men's Snooker Team
 Men's 6 Red Snooker Single
 Women's 9 Ball Single
 Women's 10 Ball Single
 Women's 6 Red Snooker Single

External links
 

Asian Indoor Games
Asian Indoor Games
2013
2013 Asian Indoor and Martial Arts Games events
Cue sports competitions in South Korea